Good Night Beijing (Chinese: 曾经相爱的我们) is a 2021 Chinese romantic comedy-drama film directed by Jaycee Chan and Zhang Xiaolei, theatrically released on 10 December 2021.

Plot
Two strange people, man Alan (Chen Bolin) and woman Meng Jie (Amber Kuo), meet and fall in love.

Cast
Chen Bolin as Alan
Amber Kuo as Meng Jie
Eric Tsang as Chen Zong
Nicholas Tse as V Dian Da Chu
Eric Moo
Jaycee Chan
Jackie Chan as Chen Shu

Filming
Jaycee announced that he has completed his directorial debut in January 2018.

References

External links

2021 films
2021 comedy-drama films
Chinese comedy-drama films